The Standing Committee on Finance and Economic Affairs is a standing committee of the Parliament of Norway. It is responsible for policies relating to economic policy, monetary and credit policy, the financial and credit system, financial administration, block grants to municipalities and counties, taxes and duties to the State Treasury, state guarantees for exports, National Insurance revenues, incomes policy (except for the Agricultural Agreement) and legislation relating to accounting and auditing. It corresponds to the Ministry of Finance. The committee has 18 members and is chaired by Hans Olav Syversen of the Christian Democratic Party.

Since the economic policy affects the resources available in all other policy areas, the Finance Committee is considered to be a powerful one, and in most cases, all parliamentary parties have at least one member on it. An exception was made in the 2013-2017 Parliament when Rasmus Hansson, the sole representative of the Green Party, asked to be seated on the Standing Committee on Energy and the Environment instead.

Members 2013–2017

References

Standing committees of the Storting
Year of establishment missing